Talbot County Courthouse may refer to:

 Talbot County Courthouse (Georgia), Talbotton, Georgia
 Talbot County Courthouse (Maryland), Easton, Maryland